Kisejärv Landscape Conservation Area is a nature park in Võru County, Estonia.

Its area is 669 ha.

The protected area was designated in 1983 to protect Kisejärve lakes and theirs surrounding areas. In 2005, the protected area was redesigned to the landscape conservation area.

References

Nature reserves in Estonia
Geography of Võru County